Club Atlético Central Norte is an Argentine football club from the city of Salta, from the Salta Province. The team currently plays in the Torneo Federal A, the regionalised third division of the Argentine football league system.

Central Norte was founded in Salta on 9 March 1921, and took its name from the state-owned Ferrocarril Central Norte whose railway line crossed the Salta Province.

Titles
Liga Salteña: 36
Torneos Regionales: 7
Torneo Argentino B: 2
 2005–06, 2009–10

External links
Central Norte fan's page 
República Azabache 
La Voz del Cuervo 

Football clubs in Salta Province
Association football clubs established in 1921
1921 establishments in Argentina